The  is a Japanese bus company. It was established on 1 July 1952 to inherit part of the business of the Dohoku Bus.

History
The SOYA bus operates around the northernmost part of Japan. The bus company belonged to Tokyu Group from 1959 until 2009.

Chronicle 
July 1952: Commenced operations
August 1954: Established Omu Office
1956: Head office moved from Esashi, Hokkaido (Sōya) to Wakkanai, Hokkaido
December 1959: Affiliated to Tokyu Corporation
1971: Discontinued Omu Office
July 1985: Kohinhoku Line was discontinued
May 1989: Tempoku Line was discontinued
October 2010: Tokyu Corporation and Jōtetsu relinquished their shares, and transferred to Jay Will Partners. Company broke away from Tokyu Corporation

Local bus services

Offices
 Wakkanai Office
 Rishiri Office (Rishiri Island)
 Rebun Office (Rebun Island)
 Esashi Office
 Sapporo Office

Wickets
 Wakkanai Bus Terminal 
 Wakkanai Ferry Terminal
 Onishibetsu Bus Terminal
 Hamatonbetsu Bus Terminal
 Otoineppu Traffic Terminal
 Shiomi Wickets

Route map

Express buses

Others
This bus company swapped employees for those who work for Horikawa Bus, Naha Bus and Ryukyu Bus since 2008. They also swapped their buses for Soya Buses. Soya Bus had company members travel to Horikawa Bus which operates around Fukuoka Prefecture and Naha Bus/Ryukyu Bus that operates around Okinawa Prefecture during summer because this company is not busy during summer. They travel to Soya Bus in Hokkaido during winter because snow is rare during winter around Kyushu region.

See also
Tokyu Group
Tokyu Corporation
Kusakaru Ueda Holdings
Jay Coach
Kanto Transportation

References

External links 
 Website

Companies based in Hokkaido
Bus companies of Japan